Jimmy Owen (born 1864; date of death unknown) was an English footballer for Port Vale and Stoke during the 1880s.

Career
Owen probably joined Port Vale in 1884. His debut for the club came on 18 October 1884 in a home friendly with Aston Villa "A", which Vale won 2–0. He became a regular in the side and grabbed two goals in the 12–0 thrashing of Ironbridge in the Burslem Challenge Cup final on 21 March 1885. He also played in the North Staffordshire Charity Challenge Cup final that same year, but departed at the end of the 1885–86 season to join Stoke, a founder club of the Football League in 1888. He had scored 17 goals in 56 games across all competitions for Port Vale.

He played for Stoke during the 1889–90 season, scoring two goals in three Football League matches. He scored goals against West Bromwich Albion (15 March) and Notts County (24 March).

Career statistics
Source:

Honours
Port Vale
Burslem Challenge Cup: 1885
North Staffordshire Charity Challenge Cup: 1885 (shared)

References

1864 births
Year of death missing
Footballers from Manchester
English footballers
Association football forwards
Port Vale F.C. players
Stoke City F.C. players
English Football League players